Beatrice d'Este (1215 – before 8 May 1245) was Queen consort of Hungary as the third wife of King Andrew II of Hungary.

Beatrice was the only child of Marquis Aldobrandino I of Este but her mother's name and origin is unknown. Since her father died in the year of her birth, she was educated by her uncle, Marquis Azzo VII of Este.

In the beginning of 1234, the elderly King Andrew II of Hungary, who had been widowed for the second time in 1233, visited the court of the Este family and fell in love with the young Beatrice. Her uncle gave his consent to the marriage only on the condition that both King Andrew and Beatrice renounced the dowry and any claim of her father's inheritance.

Their marriage was celebrated on 14 May 1234 in Székesfehérvár, and King Andrew promised in their conjugal contract that he would grant 5,000 pounds as marriage portion to Beatrice and Beatrice would also receive 1,000 pounds as her annual revenue. However, the relationship between Beatrice and her husband's sons became tense soon.

Following her husband's death on 21 September 1235, her stepson, King Béla IV of Hungary ascended the throne and he wanted to banish Beatrice from Hungary. Moreover, when the widowed Beatrice announced that she was pregnant, her stepson accused her of adultery with Denis, son of Ampud, his father's powerful royal advisor, and ordered her arrest. Beatrice could escape from Hungary only with the assistance of the ambassadors of Frederick II, Holy Roman Emperor who had arrived to the deceased king's funeral.

She went to the Holy Roman Empire, where she bore her husband's posthumous son, Stephen whose legitimacy, however, was never acknowledged by his brothers. Following the birth of her child, Beatrice was planning to live in the court of his uncle, but Marquis Azzo VII denied her request.

She spent the following years wandering in Italy, and she never gave up her son's claims to receive ducal revenues from Hungary. She tried to persuade the Republic of Venice to support her son during the war with Hungary, but the Serenissima promised King Béla IV that it would not support Beatrice and her son in the peace of 30 June 1244.

Pope Innocent IV granted her revenues of 35 monasteries in Italy.

Marriage and child
She married on 14 May 1234 to King Andrew II of Hungary (c. 1177 – 21 September 1235) and had issue:
 Stephen the Posthumous (1236 – 10 April 1271), father of the King Andrew III of Hungary.

Sources
 Soltész, István: Árpád-házi királynék (Gabo, 1999)
 Kristó, Gyula - Makk, Ferenc: Az Árpád-ház uralkodói (IPC Könyvek, 1996)

Hungarian queens consort
1215 births
1245 deaths
13th-century Hungarian women
13th-century Italian women
13th-century Hungarian people
13th-century Italian nobility